Hasanabad (also Romanized as 'Ḩasanābād and Hassanābād; also known as Hasan Abad Daroo’iyeh and Hassahābād) is a village in Esmaili Rural District, Esmaili District, Anbarabad County, Kerman Province, Iran. At the 2006 census, its population was 236, in 54 families.

References 

Populated places in Anbarabad County